Skojevsko Naselje (Serbian Cyrillic: Скојевско Насеље) is an urban neighborhood of Belgrade, the capital of Serbia. It is located in Belgrade's municipality of Rakovica.

Location
Skojevsko Naselje is located in the north-western part of the municipality, on the border of the municipality of Čukarica. It is bordered by the neighborhoods of Rakovica (on the east and south), Cerak Vinogradi (on the west) and Košutnjak and Filmski Grad (on the north).

Characteristics
Skojevsko Naselje is small, elongated neighborhood, bounded by the streets of Kneza Višeslava on the north and Luke Vojvodića on the south. The area is entirely residential. Luke Vojvodića street was previously named Skojevska Nova which was parallel to the Skojevska street (present Godominska) and this is how the neighborhood got its name (see SKOJ). So far, despite the change of the streets name, the name of the neighborhood survived. Population of the neighborhood was 5,145 in 2002.

Skojevska consists  of 3 grupations, the biggest one is the third. 

Neighborhoods of Belgrade
Rakovica, Belgrade